Canoe Lake may refer to:

Canada
 Canoe Lake (Nova Scotia)
 Canoe Lake (Saskatchewan), a lake in northeastern Saskatchewan

In Ontario
 In Algoma District
Canoe Lake (Scarfe Township)
Canoe Lake (The North Shore)
 Canoe Lake (Frontenac County)
 Canoe Lake (Kenora District)
 Canoe Lake (Lennox and Addington County)
 Canoe Lake (Nipissing District), the location of painter Tom Thomson's death in 1917
 Canoe Lake, Ontario, a community on the shore of the above lake
 Canoe Lake (Parry Sound District)
 In Renfrew County
Canoe Lake (Greater Madawaska)
Canoe Lake (Madawaska Valley)
 Canoe Lake (Sudbury District)
 In Thunder Bay District
Canoe Lake (Barnard Creek), in the northwest of Thunder Bay District
Canoe Lake (Syine Township), in geographic Syine Township near Lake Superior
 Canoe Lake (Timiskaming District)

United Kingdom
 Canoe Lake (Southsea) on Portsea Island in Hampshire

United States
 Canoe Lake (Pennsylvania) a lake at Canoe Creek State Park in Pennsylvania